Rhiannon Dennison (born 14 April 1993) is a New Zealand field hockey player who plays for the national team. She competed in the women's hockey tournament at the  where she won a bronze medal.

References

External links
 
 

1993 births
Living people
New Zealand female field hockey players
Commonwealth Games bronze medallists for New Zealand
Field hockey players at the 2014 Commonwealth Games
Field hockey players at the 2010 Summer Youth Olympics
Commonwealth Games medallists in field hockey
20th-century New Zealand women
21st-century New Zealand women
Medallists at the 2014 Commonwealth Games